Ernest Canteolo Burt Philpott (1864-1935) was Archdeacon of Malta from 1925 until his death.

Philpott was  educated at the University of London and ordained in 1893. After  curacies in Rotherhithe, Blackheath and Southwark he was Vicar at St Andrew, Catford from 1899 to 1921. During this time he was Mayor of Lewisham from 1906 to 1907. when he was appointed Commissary to the Bishop of Gibraltar.

He died on 3 February 1935.

Notes

1864 births
1935 deaths
Alumni of the University of London
Archdeacons of Malta
20th-century Maltese Anglican priests
19th-century English Anglican priests
Mayors of places in Greater London